The United Nations Convention on the Rights of the Child (commonly abbreviated as the CRC or UNCRC) is an international human rights treaty which sets out the civil, political, economic, social, health and cultural rights of children. The convention defines a child as any human being under the age of eighteen, unless the age of majority is attained earlier under national legislation.

Nations that have ratified this convention or have acceded to it are bound by international law. When a state has signed the treaty but not ratified it, it is not yet bound by the treaty's provisions but is already obliged to not act contrary to its purpose.

The UN Committee on the Rights of the Child, composed of 18 independent experts, is responsible for supervising the implementation of the convention by the states that have ratified it. Their governments are required to report to and appear before the UN Committee on the Rights of the Child periodically to be examined on their progress regarding the advancement of the implementation of the convention and the status of child rights in their country. Their reports and the committee's written views and concerns are available on the committee's website.

Individuals can appeal to the Committee on the Rights of the Child if they believe that rights, according to the convention, have been violated. The third possibility for monitoring the implementation of the convention is inquiries that the Committee on the Rights of the Child can carry out on their own initiative if they have reliable information that leads them to believe that a member state has violated the convention's rights. However, "states ... may opt-out from the inquiry procedure, at the time of signature or ratification or accession". Once a year, the committee submits a report to the Third Committee of the United Nations General Assembly, which also hears a statement from the CRC Chair, and the Assembly adopts a Resolution on the Rights of the Child.

The UN General Assembly adopted the convention and opened it for signature on 20 November 1989 (the 30th anniversary of its Declaration of the Rights of the Child). It came into force on 2 September 1990, after it was ratified by the required number of nations.

Two optional protocols were adopted on 25 May 2000. The First Optional Protocol restricts the involvement of children in military conflicts, and the Second Optional Protocol prohibits the sale of children, child prostitution and child pornography. More than 170 states have ratified both protocols. A third optional protocol relating to communication of complaints was adopted in December 2011 and opened for signature on 28 February 2012. It came into effect on 14 April 2014.

Contents
The convention deals with child-specific needs and rights. It requires that the "nations that ratify this convention are bound to it by international law." Ratifying states must act in the best interests of the child.

In all jurisdictions implementing the convention requires compliance with child custody and guardianship laws as every child has basic rights, including the right to life, to their own name and identity, to be raised by their parents within a family or cultural grouping, and to have a relationship with both parents, even if they are separated.

The convention obliges states to allow parents to exercise their parental responsibilities. The convention also acknowledges that children have the right to express their opinions and to have those opinions heard and acted upon when appropriate, to be protected from abuse or exploitation, and to have their privacy protected. It requires that their lives not be subject to excessive interference.

The convention also obliges signatory states to separate legal representation for a child in any judicial dispute concerning their care and asks that the child's viewpoint be heard in such cases.

The convention forbids capital punishment for children. In its General Comment 8 (2006) the committee stated that there was an "obligation of all state parties to move quickly to prohibit and eliminate all corporal punishment and all other cruel or degrading forms of punishment of children". Article 19 of the convention states that state parties must "take all appropriate legislative, administrative, social and educational measures to protect the child from all forms of physical or mental violence", but it makes no reference to corporal punishment. The committee's interpretation of this section to encompass a prohibition on corporal punishment has been rejected by several state parties to the convention, including Australia, Canada and the United Kingdom.

The European Court of Human Rights has referred to the convention when interpreting the European Convention on Human Rights.

Global standards and cultural relativism
Global human rights standards were challenged at the World Conference on Human Rights in Vienna (1993) when a number of governments (prominently China, Indonesia, Malaysia and Iran) raised serious objections to the idea of universal human rights. There are unresolved tensions between "universalistic" and "relativistic" approaches in the establishment of standards and strategies designed to prevent or overcome the abuse of children's capacity to work.

Child marriage and slavery
Some scholars link child marriages to slavery and slavery-like practices. Child marriage as slavery is not directly addressed by the convention.

States party and signatories
The term “party” refers to a State that gives its explicit consent to be bound by the treaty.   

The most recent ratifications of the convention were by Cook Islands, Niue, the State of Palestine, and the Holy See. South Sudan ratified the convention in January 2015. Somalia's domestic ratification finished in January 2015 and the instrument was deposited with the United Nations in October 2015. Taiwan incorporated the convention into domestic law on 20 November 2014, and signed an Instrument of Accession to the CRC on 16 May 2016.

All successor states of Czechoslovakia (Czech Republic and Slovakia) and Yugoslavia (Bosnia and Herzegovina, Croatia, North Macedonia, Montenegro, Serbia, Slovenia) made declarations of succession to the treaty and currently apply it.

The convention does not apply in the territories of Tokelau, Akrotiri and Dhekelia and Gibraltar. Guernsey was also excluded until 2020.

Azerbaijan 
Azerbaijan ratified the convention on 21 July 1992. In terms of the ratification of the convention, a significant number of laws, decrees and resolutions were approved in Azerbaijan by the President and the Cabinet of Ministers focusing on the development of the child welfare system. In this regard, the Convention No. 182 of the International Labour Organization, i.e. the Convention on the Elimination of the Worst Forms of Child Labour, the Recommendation No. 190 of the International Labour Organization and the Hague Adoption Convention were ratified by Milli Majlis, the parliament of Azerbaijan, in 2004.

There is a concern over the administration of juvenile justice in Azerbaijan, mostly regarding compliance with articles 37, 39, and 40 of the convention, as well as other relevant standards such as the Beijing Rules, the Riyadh Guidelines, and the United Nations Rules for the Protection of Juveniles Deprived of their Liberty. Therefore, international organizations assisted Azerbaijan to improve the situation in the field of juvenile justice. Juvenile offenders have been added to the Presidential pardons on a regular basis.

Azerbaijan has built cooperation with many international organizations, particularly with UNICEF in child protection. In 1993, UNICEF began its activity in Azerbaijan. In 2005, Azerbaijan and UNICEF signed a five-year country program. The country program for 2005-2009 was implemented in child protection, children's health and nutrition, children's education and youth health, and their development and participation. Also, UNICEF supports Azerbaijan in improving its juvenile justice system, establishing an alternative care system and raising awareness among youth about HIV/AIDS.

Canada 
Canada became a signatory to the convention on 28 May 1990 and ratified in 1991. Youth criminal laws in Canada underwent major changes resulting in the Youth Criminal Justice Act (YCJA) which went into effect on 1 April 2003. The Act specifically refers to Canada's different commitments under the convention. The convention was influential in the administrative law decision of Baker v Canada (Minister of Citizenship and Immigration).

India 
India ratified UNCRC on 11 December 1992, agreeing in principle to all articles but with certain reservations on issues relating to child labor. In India, there is a law that children under the age of 18 should not work, but there is no outright ban on child labor. The practice is generally permitted in most industries except those deemed "hazardous", for which minimum ages apply. Although a law in October 2006 banned child labor in hotels, restaurants, and as domestic servants, there continues to be a high demand for children as hired help in the home. There are different estimates as to the number of child laborers in the country. According to the government's conservative estimate, in 2011 4.4 million children under 14 years of age were working in India, while the NGO Save the Children in a statement of 2016 cites a study by the Campaign Against Child Labour that estimates the number of child laborers in India at 12.7 million.

In 2016, the Child and Adolescent Labour (Amendment) Act was introduced, which prohibited children's economic employment under the age of 14 years and the employment of adolescents (14–17 years of age) in hazardous occupations. Some exceptions exist for children under 14 —they can aid in the family enterprise and participate in the entertainment industry. It must not harm their school education and they must not work between 7 p.m. and 8 a.m.

Iran

Iran has adhered to the convention (except for alleged child slavery) since 1991 and ratified it in the Parliament in 1994. Upon ratification, Iran made the following reservation: "If the text of the Convention is or becomes incompatible with the domestic laws and Islamic standards at any time or in any case, the Government of the Islamic Republic shall not abide by it." Iran has also signed both optional protocols which relate to the special protection of children against involvement in armed conflict and the sale of children and sexual exploitation.

Although Iran is a state party to the convention, international human rights organisations and foreign governments routinely denounced executions of Iranian child offenders as a violation of the treaty. But on 10 February 2012, Iran's parliament changed the controversial law of executing juveniles. In the new law, the age of 18 (solar year) would be considered the minimum age for adulthood and offenders under this age will be sentenced under a separate law. Based on the previous law, which was revised, girls at the age of 9 and boys at 15 (lunar year, 11 days shorter than a solar year) were fully responsible for their crimes.

"According to Islamic sources, the criterion for criminal responsibility is reaching the age of maturity which, according to the Shi'ite School of the IRI, is 9 lunar years (8 years and 9 months) for girls and 15 lunar years (14 years and 7 months) for boys."

Ireland
Ireland signed the convention on 30 September 1990 and ratified it, without reservation, on 28 September 1992. In response to criticisms expressed in the 1998 review by the UN Committee on the Rights of the Child in Geneva, the Irish government established the office of Ombudsman for Children. It drew up a national children's strategy. In 2006, following concerns expressed by the committee that the wording of the Irish Constitution does not allow the State to intervene in abuse cases other than in very exceptional cases, the Irish government undertook to amend the constitution to make a more explicit commitment to children's rights.

Israel
Israel ratified the convention in 1991. In 2010, UNICEF criticized Israel for its failure to create a government-appointed commission on children's rights or adopt a national children's rights strategy or program to implement various Israeli laws addressing children's rights. The report criticizes Israel for holding that the convention does not apply in the West Bank and for defining Palestinians under the age of 16 in the occupied territories as children, even though Israeli law defines a child as being under 18, in line with the convention. A contemporaneous report by the Organisation for Economic Co-operation and Development found that Israel's investment in children is below the international average. The actual investment had fallen between 1995 and 2006. In 2012, the United Nations Committee on the Rights of the Child criticized Israel for its bombing attacks on Palestinians in the Gaza Strip, stating, "Destruction of homes and damage to schools, streets and other public facilities gravely affect children" and called them "gross violations of the convention on the Rights of the Child, its Optional Protocol on the involvement of children in armed conflict and international humanitarian law". It also criticized Palestinian rocket attacks from Gaza on southern Israel, which traumatized Israeli children, calling on all parties to protect children.

New Zealand
New Zealand ratified the convention on 6 April 1993 with reservations concerning the right to distinguish between persons according to the nature of their authority to be in New Zealand, the need for legislative action on economic exploitation—which it argued was adequately protected by existing law, and the provisions for the separation of juvenile offenders from adult offenders.

In 1994, the Court of Appeal of New Zealand dismissed the suggestion that the Minister for Immigration and his department were at liberty to ignore the convention, arguing that this would imply that the country's adherence was "at least partly window-dressing".

The Children's Commissioner Act 2003 enhanced the Office of the Children's Commissioner (OCC), giving it significantly stronger investigative powers. The OCC is responsible for convening the UNCROC Monitoring Group, which monitors the New Zealand Government's implementation of the Children's Convention, its Optional Protocols and the Government's response to recommendations from the United Nations Committee on the Rights of the Child. The monitoring group comprises members from the Human Rights Commission (New Zealand), UNICEF New Zealand, Action for Children and Youth Aotearoa and Save the Children New Zealand.

In May 2007, New Zealand passed the Crimes (Substituted Section 59) Amendment Act 2007, which removed the defence of "reasonable force" for the purpose of correction. In its third and final vote, Parliament voted 113 to eight in favour of the legislation.

Saudi Arabia
Saudi Arabia ratified the convention in 1996, with a reservation "with respect to all such articles as are in conflict with the provisions of Islamic law" which is the national law. The Committee on the Rights of the Child, which reviewed Saudi Arabia's treatment of children under the convention in January 2005, strongly condemned the government for its practice of imposing the death penalty on juveniles, calling it "a serious violation of the fundamental rights". The committee said it was "deeply alarmed" over the discretionary power judges hold to treat juveniles as adults: In its 2004 report, the Saudi Arabian government had stated that it "never imposes capital punishment on persons ... below the age of 18". The government delegation later acknowledged that a judge could impose the death penalty whenever he decided that the convicted person had reached his or her majority, regardless of the person's actual age at the time of the crime or at the time of the scheduled execution. But the death penalty was ended for minors in April 2020.

On 20 October 2020, Human Rights Watch said that Saudi Arabia was seeking the death penalty against eight Saudi men who were accused of committing protest-related crimes at the age of 14 and 17. One of the boys who turned 18 in 2020 was charged with a nonviolent crime that he allegedly committed aged 9. Under the hudud – an Islamic law – prosecutors have reportedly sought the death penalty for the eight men, which if granted will make them ineligible for pardon.

Sweden
The Convention on the Rights of the Child has status as Swedish law since 1 January 2020. Also, before that, Swedish legislation was well in line with the convention and went in some cases further. It was given this status because Swedish authorities and the government thought the childs right perspective was not applied sufficiently in Swedish social welfare decisions and law enforcement.

United Kingdom 
The United Kingdom ratified the convention on 16 December 1991, with several declarations and reservations, and made its first report to the Committee on the Rights of the Child in January 1995. Concerns raised by the committee included the growth in child poverty and inequality, the extent of violence towards children, the use of custody for young offenders, the low age of criminal responsibility, and the lack of opportunities for children and young people to express views. The 2002 report of the committee expressed similar concerns, including the welfare of children in custody, unequal treatment of asylum seekers, and the negative impact of poverty on children's rights. In September 2008, the UK government decided to withdraw its reservations and agree to the convention in these respects.

The 2002 report's criticism of the legal defence of "reasonable chastisement" of children by parents, which the committee described as "a serious violation of the dignity of the child", was rejected by the UK Government. The Minister for Children, Young People and Families commented that while fewer parents are using smacking as a form of discipline, the majority said they would not support a ban. The devolved legislatures of Scotland and Wales have passed laws banning smacking, in force in November 2020 and March 2022 respectively.

In evidence to the parliamentary Joint Committee on Human Rights, the committee was criticised by the Family Education Trust for "adopting radical interpretations of the UN Convention on the Rights of the Child in its pursuit of an agenda". The joint committee's report recommended that "the time has come for the Government to act upon the recommendations of the UN Committee on the Rights of the Child concerning the corporal punishment of children and the incompatibility of the defence of reasonable chastisement with its obligations under the Convention." The UK Government responded that "the use of physical punishment is a matter for individual parents to decide".

Although child slavery is difficult to gauge within the UK, child slaves are imported into the UK and sold. Laws and enforcement mechanisms against slavery and human trafficking were consolidated and strengthened in the Modern Slavery Act 2015.

On 1 September 2020, the United Nations Convention on the Rights of the Child (Incorporation) (Scotland) Bill was introduced in the Scottish Parliament. This bill would enshrine the UNCRC into Scots Law. On 19 January, MSPs passed the general principles of the bill at stage 1, 118–0. The bill received many endorsements, including strong endorsement from the Scottish Youth Parliament. The bill passed unanimously on its third stage in the Scottish Parliament. However, in October 2021 the UK Supreme Court held that central provisions of the bill were outwith the authority of the Scottish Parliament, and the bill has not taken effect.

United States  

The United States government played an active role in the drafting of the convention and signed it on 16 February 1995, but has not ratified it. It has been claimed that American opposition to the convention stems primarily from political and religious conservatives. For example, The Heritage Foundation considers that "a civil society in which moral authority is exercised by religious congregations, family, and other private associations is fundamental to the American order", and the Home School Legal Defense Association (HSLDA) argues that the CRC threatens homeschooling.

Most notably, at the time several states permitted the execution and life imprisonment of juvenile offenders, a direct contravention of Article 37 of the convention. The landmark 2005 Supreme Court decision in Roper v. Simmons declared juvenile executions to be unconstitutional as "cruel and unusual punishment"; in the 2012 case Miller v. Alabama, the court held that mandatory sentences of life without the possibility of parole are unconstitutional for juvenile offenders.

State laws regarding the practice of closed adoption may also require an overhaul in light of the Convention's position that children have a right to identity from birth.

During his 2008 campaign for President, Senator Barack Obama described the failure to ratify the convention as "embarrassing" and promised to review the issue but, as President, he never did. No President of the United States has submitted the treaty to the United States Senate requesting its advice and consent to ratification since the US signed it in 1995.

The United States has ratified two of the optional protocols to the convention: the Optional Protocol on the Involvement of Children in Armed Conflict, and the Optional Protocol on the Sale of Children, Child Prostitution and Child Pornography.

Optional protocols
There are three optional protocols to the Convention on the Rights of the Child. The first, the Optional Protocol on the Involvement of Children in Armed Conflict requires parties to ensure that children under the age of 18 are not recruited compulsorily into their armed forces and calls on governments to do everything feasible to ensure that members of their armed forces who are under 18 years do not take part in hostilities. This protocol entered into force on 12 July 2002.

The second, the Optional Protocol on the Sale of Children, Child Prostitution and Child Pornography, requires parties to prohibit the sale of children, child prostitution and child pornography. It entered into force on 18 January 2002.

A third, the Optional Protocol to the Convention on the Rights of the Child on a Communications Procedure, which would allow children or their representatives to file individual complaints for violation of the rights of children, was adopted in December 2011 and opened for signature on 28 February 2012. The protocol currently has 52 signatures and 50 ratifications: it entered into force on 14 April 2014 following the tenth ratification three months beforehand.

Proposals for additional optional protocols have also been made. In 2020, the independent "Lancet-WHO-UNICEF Commission" proposed the development of an optional protocol to protect children from the marketing of tobacco, alcohol, formula milk, sugar-sweetened beverages, gambling, and potentially damaging social media, and the inappropriate use of their personal data. (The WHO also has their own framework for making treaties.) In 2022, a group of international child rights and education experts joined a call for an update to the right to education under international law to explicitly guarantee children’s right to free pre-primary and free secondary education. Human Rights Watch has suggested doing so through a fourth optional protocol to the CRC.

Parental rights 
On 7 October 2020, the vote on United Nations Draft Resolution A/HRC/45/L.48/Rev.1 – "Rights of the child: Realizing the rights of the child through a healthy environment" submitted by Germany (on behalf of the European Union) and Uruguay (on behalf of GRULAC) was adopted.

The Russian Federation's Amendments L.57 and L.64 to include parental rights were rejected. The Russian delegate, Kristina Sukacheva, remarked that governments voting against parents deliberately shirk their international responsibilities to provide for the rights of the child. At the time of adoption, Uruguay stated that the incorporation of parental rights language as proposed by the Russian Federation would "bring imbalance to the resolution and would also go against the spirit of the resolution".

See also

References

External links 

 
 Signatures and ratifications, at depositary
 Information for children on the Convention on the Rights of the Child on the website of the Office of the United Nations High Commissioner for Human Rights (OHCHR).
 Information on the Convention of the Rights of the Child on the website of UNICEF, the children's organization of the United Nations.
 Procedural history, related documents and photos on the Convention on the Rights of the Child (including its Optional Protocols) in the Historic Archives of the United Nations Audiovisual Library of International Law.
 NGO Alternative Reports submitted to the Committee on the Rights of the Child.
 Biography of Eglantyne Jebb, author of the original Declaration.
Convention on the Rights of the Child - Guidelines regarding the implementation of the Optional Protocol to the Convention on the Rights of the Child on the sale of children, child prostitution and child pornography (adopted by the Committee at its eighty-first session on 13–31 May 2019).

 
United Nations treaties
Convention on the Rights of the Child
Human rights instruments
Treaties concluded in 1989
Treaties entered into force in 1990
Treaties of the Islamic State of Afghanistan
Treaties of Albania
Treaties of Algeria
Treaties of Andorra
Treaties of the People's Republic of Angola
Treaties of Antigua and Barbuda
Treaties of Argentina
Treaties of Armenia
Treaties of Australia
Treaties of Austria
Treaties of Azerbaijan
Treaties of the Bahamas
Treaties of Bahrain
Treaties of Bangladesh
Treaties of Barbados
Treaties of the Byelorussian Soviet Socialist Republic
Treaties of Belgium
Treaties of Belize
Treaties of Benin
Treaties of Bhutan
Treaties of Bolivia
Treaties of Bosnia and Herzegovina
Treaties of Botswana
Treaties of Brazil
Treaties of Brunei
Treaties of Bulgaria
Treaties of Burkina Faso
Treaties of Myanmar
Treaties of Burundi
Treaties of the State of Cambodia
Treaties of Cameroon
Treaties of Canada
Treaties of Cape Verde
Treaties of the Central African Republic
Treaties of Chad
Treaties of Chile
Treaties of the People's Republic of China
Treaties of Colombia
Treaties of the Comoros
Treaties of Zaire
Treaties of the Republic of the Congo
Treaties of the Cook Islands
Treaties of Costa Rica
Treaties of Ivory Coast
Treaties of Croatia
Treaties of Cuba
Treaties of Cyprus
Treaties of the Czech Republic
Treaties of Denmark
Treaties of Djibouti
Treaties of Dominica
Treaties of the Dominican Republic
Treaties of East Timor
Treaties of Ecuador
Treaties of Egypt
Treaties of El Salvador
Treaties of Equatorial Guinea
Treaties of Eritrea
Treaties of Estonia
Treaties of the People's Democratic Republic of Ethiopia
Treaties of Fiji
Treaties of Finland
Treaties of France
Treaties of Gabon
Treaties of the Gambia
Treaties of Georgia (country)
Treaties of Germany
Treaties of Ghana
Treaties of Greece
Treaties of Grenada
Treaties of Guatemala
Treaties of Guinea
Treaties of Guinea-Bissau
Treaties of Haiti
Treaties of Honduras
Treaties of Hungary
Treaties of Iceland
Treaties of India
Treaties of Indonesia
Treaties of Iran
Treaties of Ba'athist Iraq
Treaties of Ireland
Treaties of Israel
Treaties of Italy
Treaties of Jamaica
Treaties of Japan
Treaties of Jordan
Treaties of Kazakhstan
Treaties of Kenya
Treaties of Kiribati
Treaties of North Korea
Treaties of South Korea
Treaties of Kuwait
Treaties of Kyrgyzstan
Treaties of Laos
Treaties of Latvia
Treaties of Lebanon
Treaties of Lesotho
Treaties of Liberia
Treaties of the Libyan Arab Jamahiriya
Treaties of Liechtenstein
Treaties of Lithuania
Treaties of Luxembourg
Treaties of North Macedonia
Treaties of Madagascar
Treaties of Malawi
Treaties of Malaysia
Treaties of the Maldives
Treaties of Mali
Treaties of Malta
Treaties of the Marshall Islands
Treaties of Mauritania
Treaties of Mauritius
Treaties of Mexico
Treaties of the Federated States of Micronesia
Treaties of Moldova
Treaties of Monaco
Treaties of the Mongolian People's Republic
Treaties of Montenegro
Treaties of Morocco
Treaties of Mozambique
Treaties of Namibia
Treaties of Nauru
Treaties of Nepal
Treaties of the Netherlands
Treaties of New Zealand
Treaties of Nicaragua
Treaties of Niue
Treaties of Niger
Treaties of Nigeria
Treaties of Norway
Treaties of Oman
Treaties of Pakistan
Treaties of Palau
Treaties of the State of Palestine
Treaties of Panama
Treaties of Papua New Guinea
Treaties of Paraguay
Treaties of Peru
Treaties of the Philippines
Treaties of Poland
Treaties of Portugal
Treaties of Qatar
Treaties of Romania
Treaties of the Soviet Union
Treaties of Rwanda
Treaties of Saint Kitts and Nevis
Treaties of Saint Lucia
Treaties of Saint Vincent and the Grenadines
Treaties of Samoa
Treaties of San Marino
Treaties of São Tomé and Príncipe
Treaties of Saudi Arabia
Treaties of Senegal
Treaties of Serbia and Montenegro
Treaties of Seychelles
Treaties of Sierra Leone
Treaties of Singapore
Treaties of Slovakia
Treaties of Slovenia
Treaties of the Solomon Islands
Treaties of Somalia
Treaties of South Africa
Treaties of South Sudan
Treaties of Spain
Treaties of Sri Lanka
Treaties of the Republic of the Sudan (1985–2011)
Treaties of Suriname
Treaties of Eswatini
Treaties of Sweden
Treaties of Switzerland
Treaties of Syria
Treaties of Tajikistan
Treaties of Thailand
Treaties of Togo
Treaties of Tonga
Treaties of Trinidad and Tobago
Treaties of Tunisia
Treaties of Turkey
Treaties of Turkmenistan
Treaties of Tuvalu
Treaties of Uganda
Treaties of Ukraine
Treaties of the United Arab Emirates
Treaties of the United Kingdom
Treaties of the United States
Treaties of Uruguay
Treaties of Uzbekistan
Treaties of Vanuatu
Treaties of Venezuela
Treaties of Vietnam
Treaties of Yemen
Treaties of Zambia
Treaties of Zimbabwe
Treaties of Czechoslovakia
Treaties of East Germany
Treaties of the Holy See
Treaties of Yugoslavia
1980 in New York City
Treaties adopted by United Nations General Assembly resolutions
Treaties extended to Anguilla
Treaties extended to Bermuda
Treaties extended to the British Virgin Islands
Treaties extended to the Cayman Islands
Treaties extended to the Falkland Islands
Treaties extended to the Isle of Man
Treaties extended to Montserrat
Treaties extended to the Pitcairn Islands
Treaties extended to Saint Helena, Ascension and Tristan da Cunha
Treaties extended to South Georgia and the South Sandwich Islands
Treaties extended to the Turks and Caicos Islands
Treaties extended to the Netherlands Antilles
Treaties extended to Aruba
Treaties extended to the Faroe Islands
Treaties extended to Greenland
Treaties extended to British Hong Kong
Treaties extended to Portuguese Macau
Treaties extended to Jersey
November 1989 events